The International Show Jumping Contest of Gijón, commonly known as CSI Gijón or CSIO Gijón when it becomes official, is a show jumping event held in Gijón, Spain, at the Las Mestas Sports Complex.

It is considered as a CSI 5* by the FEI. One of the main characteristics of the event is the fact that betting is allowed and very popular among spectators.

History 
The event was established in 1941 to promote equestrianism in Gijón and to offer an important sporting event in the city during the summertime. The first competition took place during 20–24 August 1942, and was a complete success as crowds of around 10,000 people gathered for the event, a rather unusual amount for what was not considered a spectator sport at the time.

In 1987, the event has been the Spanish official show jumping horse showfor the first time. In 1995, it recovered this condition until 2019 with the only exception of 2008.

In December 2019, the organizers resigned to the officiality of the event as they did not accept the conditions requested by the FEI about replacing the grass with sand and banning bets.

On 14 December 2020, the Principality of Asturias declared the Show Jumping Contest as a Festivity of Regional Touristic Interest.

Nations Cup 
When the event is chosen as Spain's official show jumping event, becoming a CSIO, it includes a Nations Cup competition. In 1999 was the Samsung Nations Cup Final event.

Nations Cup winners

Performance by country

Participation details

Grand Prix 
The second most important competition of the event is the Prince of Asturias Grand Prix, while the most important one is the Gijón Grand Prix.

Gijón Grand Prix winners

Attendances
This is a list of attendances at CSI Gijón.

References

External links 
Official website
CSIO Gijón. Non-official website

 
Show jumping events
Equestrian sports competitions in Spain
Sport in Gijón